Edwin Arthur Hall (February 11, 1909 – October 18, 2004) was a Republican member of the United States House of Representatives from New York.

Hall was born in Binghamton, New York. He graduated from Cornell University in 1931, and was involved in several Binghamton-area businesses, including banking and construction.  He was a member of the Binghamton City Council from 1937 until 1939. Hall was elected to Congress in 1939 to fill the vacancy caused by the death of Bert Lord and served from November 7, 1939, until January 3, 1953.

From 1953 to 1954 he was administrative assistant to New York State Assembly member Richard H. Knauf, and in 1955 and 1956 he was employed by the New York State Civil Service Commission. From 1957 to 1958 he was a member of the staff of the New York State Soil Conservation Service.

Hall then relocated to Pennsylvania and served on the Silver Lake School District Board from 1962 to 1965 and the Montrose Area School District Board from 1965 to 1971.

Hall died in Montrose, Pennsylvania on October 18, 2004. At the time of his death, he was the last living congressman to have served in the 1930s. He was buried at Quaker Lake Cemetery in Brackney.

He was the great-grandson of United States Representative John A. Collier.

Sources

Edwin Arthur Hall at Political Graveyard

|-

1909 births
2004 deaths
Cornell University alumni
New York (state) city council members
Republican Party members of the New York State Assembly
Politicians from Binghamton, New York
People from Susquehanna County, Pennsylvania
People from Montrose, Pennsylvania
School board members in Pennsylvania
Burials in Pennsylvania
Republican Party members of the United States House of Representatives from New York (state)
20th-century American politicians